Kazakhstan is a transcontinental country in northern Central Asia and Eastern Europe. Kazakhstan is the dominant nation of Central Asia economically, generating 60% of the region's GDP, primarily through its oil/gas industry. It also has vast mineral resources.

Kazakhstan was the last of the Soviet republics to declare independence following the dissolution of the Soviet Union in 1991. The current President, Nursultan Nazarbayev, has been leader of the country since then, and is characterised as authoritarian, with a government history of human rights abuses and suppression of political opposition. Kazakhstan has worked to develop its economy, especially its dominant hydrocarbon industry. 

For further information on the types of business entities in this country and their abbreviations, see "Business entities in Kazakhstan".

Notable firms 
This list includes notable companies with primary headquarters located in the country. The industry and sector follow the Industry Classification Benchmark taxonomy. Organizations which have ceased operations are included and noted as defunct.

References 

Companies
Kazakhstan